Obârșeni may refer to several villages in Romania:

 Obârșeni, a village in Vinderei Commune, Vaslui County
 Obârșeni, a village in Voinești Commune, Vaslui County

See also 
 Obârșia (disambiguation)